Wayne Township is one of eight townships in Fulton County, Indiana. As of the 2010 census, its population was 569 and it contained 253 housing units.

Geography

Unincorporated towns
 Fletcher
 Grass Creek
 Marshtown
(This list is based on USGS data and may include former settlements.)

Adjacent townships
 Union Township (north)
 Rochester Township (northeast)
 Liberty Township (east)
 Bethlehem Township, Cass County (southeast)
 Harrison Township, Cass County (south)
 Boone Township, Cass County (southwest)
 Van Buren Township, Pulaski County (west)
 Harrison Township, Pulaski County (northwest)

Major highways
  Indiana State Road 17
  Indiana State Road 114

Cemeteries
The township contains eight cemeteries: Reed, Fletcher's Lake, Grass Creek, St. Anne, Bauman, Old Allison Farm, Hizer, Old A. D. Toner

References
 United States Census Bureau cartographic boundary files
 U.S. Board on Geographic Names

External links
 Indiana Township Association
 United Township Association of Indiana

Townships in Fulton County, Indiana
Townships in Indiana